John Lawrence Paynter was a Canadian diplomat who served as Ambassador to Russia, China, Thailand, Laos, Burma, Vietnam, and Mongolia and as High Commissioner to India and Nepal. He held academic degrees from The University of British Columbia, Tufts University and Oxford University.  He received a Canadian Commonwealth Scholarship to Oxford in 1963.  He died October 31, 1995, shortly after his appointment as Ambassador to China.

External links 
Report of John L Paynter appointment to China
Report of death of John L Paynter

1995 deaths
Year of birth missing
Ambassadors of Canada to Russia
Ambassadors of Canada to China
Ambassadors of Canada to Myanmar
Ambassadors of Canada to Thailand
Ambassadors of Canada to Vietnam
Ambassadors of Canada to Mongolia
High Commissioners of Canada to India
High Commissioners of Canada to Nepal